Dmitrii Kokarev (also spelled Dmitry, born February 11, 1991, in Nizhny Novgorod) is a Russian swimmer.

Career 
He represented Russia at the 2008 Summer Paralympics in Beijing, winning two gold medals in the 200 metre freestyle and 100 metre freestyle events. Kokarev competes in the S2 disability category, for athletes with severe disabilities. He set a world record in the S2  freestyle, with a time of 4:45.43. His time in the  event was 2:19.39.

References

External links 
 

Living people
1991 births
Russian male freestyle swimmers
Paralympic swimmers of Russia
Paralympic gold medalists for Russia
Paralympic silver medalists for Russia
Paralympic bronze medalists for Russia
Swimmers at the 2008 Summer Paralympics
Swimmers at the 2012 Summer Paralympics
Medalists at the 2008 Summer Paralympics
Medalists at the 2012 Summer Paralympics
World record holders in paralympic swimming
Medalists at the World Para Swimming Championships
Medalists at the World Para Swimming European Championships
Paralympic medalists in swimming
Russian male backstroke swimmers
S2-classified Paralympic swimmers
Sportspeople from Nizhny Novgorod
20th-century Russian people
21st-century Russian people